R340 road may refer to:
 R340 road (Ireland)
 R340 road (South Africa)